Herbie Smith (21 March 1914 – 23 February 1997) was an Australian cricketer. He played one first-class cricket match for Victoria in 1938.

See also
 List of Victoria first-class cricketers

References

External links
 

1914 births
1997 deaths
Australian cricketers
Victoria cricketers
Cricketers from Melbourne